A Messrelation (IPA: /ˈmɛsʀɛlaˌt͡si̯oːn/, Early Modern German for 'trade fair report') was a print published in the 16th to 18th century for the book fairs in Frankfurt and Leipzig (the largest in Europe at their time) which reported news about political and military news since the last fair. Messrelationen are seen as precursors to modern newspapers as they were the first printed news media to be published periodically.

The Austrian scholar Michael von Aitzing (ca. 1530–1598) is commonly seen as their inventor, having published for the first time a Relatio Historica ('Historical Report', printed in Cologne) at the autumn 1583 book fair in Frankfurt, in which he related the events in the Low Countries since February 1580 on 144 quarto pages. This was a huge success and from 1588 Aitzing published his "relations" twice a year, for the Easter book fair at Leipzig and for the autumn book fair at Frankfurt. Since 1590, competitors published their own Messrelationen. The  first one from Frankfurt was published in 1591 (running until 1806), the first one from Leipzig in 1605 (running until 1730).

The historian Ulrich Rosseaux argues „to view the Messrelationen as a separate type of Early Modern media whose essential properties are the periodicity, respectability and compactness of its reports. From the perspective of their publishers, they acted as a continuously amended chronicle of the present and therefore a constitutive part of contemporaneous historiography.“

The Messrelationen, which encompassed on average 100 pages, drew their news from correspondents or (non-periodical) newssheets (Newe Zeytungen). Often they contained reports by postmasters, merchants or travellers.

References

Further reading
 Juliane Glüer: Meßrelationen um 1600 - ein neues Medium zwischen aktueller Presse und Geschichtsschreibung. Ein textsortengeschichtliche Untersuchung [Messrelationen around 1600 - a new medium between contemporary press and historiography. An inquiry into the history of text types] (2000).
 Esther-Beate Körber: Messrelationen. Geschichte der deutsch- und lateinischsprachigen "messentlichen" Periodika von 1588 bis 1805 [Messrelationen. A History of German- and Latin-language trade-fair periodicals from 1588 till 1805] (2016).
 Ulrich Rosseaux: "Die Entstehung der Meßrelationen. Zur Entwicklung eines frühneuzeitlichen Nachrichtenmediums aus der Zeitgeschichtsschreibung des 16. Jahrhunderts" [The emergence of Messrelationen. On the development of an Early Modern news medium from the 16th century historiography of the present], in Historisches Jahrbuch 124 (2004), pp. 97–123.
 Rudolf Stöber: Deutsche Pressegeschichte. Einführung, Systematik, Glossar [A History of German press. Introduction, Classification, Glossary] (2000).

External links
 Central database of 16th century German prints, often provides digital copies. Search for Relatio historica.
 Central database of 17th century German prints, often provides digital copies. Search e.g. for Messrelation.

History of journalism